Bandar-e Micha-il (also Romanized as Bandar-e Mīchā-īl; also known as Bandar-e Machāhīr, Macha Hīl, Machāhīr, Majāhīl, Makahil, Mīchāhīl, Micha-il, Mūchāhīl, and Nachāḩīl) is a village in Moqam Rural District, Shibkaveh District, Bandar Lengeh County, Hormozgan Province, Iran. At the 2006 census, its population was 95, in 16 families.

References 

Populated places in Bandar Lengeh County